Broti & Pacek – Irgendwas ist immer is a German television series.

See also
List of German television series

External links
 

2002 German television series debuts
2004 German television series endings
German comedy-drama television series
German-language television shows
German television spin-offs
Sat.1 original programming